"I Love This Life" is a song by Swedish singer-songwriter, Kim Cesarion. Written by Cesarion, Lukasz Duchnowski, Arnthor Birgisson and Gary Clark and produced by the latter two "I Love This Life" was first released on March 21, 2014 as the third single from Cesarion's debut studio album, Undressed (2014).

Track listing 
Digital Download

Charts

References 

2014 songs
2014 singles